Lea Antonoplis defeated Peanut Louie in the final, 7–5, 6–1 to win the girls' singles tennis title at the 1977 Wimbledon Championships.

Seeds

  Anne Smith (semifinals)
  Hana Strachoňová (third round)
  Peanut Louie (final)
  Claudia Casabianca (quarterfinals)

Draw

Finals

Top half

Section 1

Section 2

Bottom half

Section 3

Section 4

References

External links

Girls' Singles
Wimbledon Championship by year – Girls' singles
Wimb